Wolverhampton South may refer to:

 the southern area of the city of Wolverhampton in the West Midlands of England
 Wolverhampton South (UK Parliament constituency) (1885–1918)